Fritts is a surname. Notable people with the surname include:

Charles Fritts, American inventor
Donnie Fritts (1942–2019), American musician and songwriter
George Fritts (1919–1987), American football player and coach
Harry W. Fritts Jr. (1921–2011), American physician and medical school professor
Paul Fritts, American pipe organ builder
Stan Fritts (born 1952), American football player